Władysław Podgórski (12 July 1956 – 9 May 1976) was a Polish cross-country skier. He competed in the men's 15 kilometre event at the 1976 Winter Olympics.

References

External links
 

1956 births
1976 deaths
Polish male cross-country skiers
Olympic cross-country skiers of Poland
Cross-country skiers at the 1976 Winter Olympics
People from Nowy Sącz County